The 2015–16 season is the 44th season in AD Alcorcón ’s history and the 6th in the second-tier.

Squad

Youth players

Out on loan

Competitions

Overall

Liga

League table

Matches
Kickoff times are in CET.

Copa del Rey

Second round

References

AD Alcorcón seasons
Alcorcon